Huimanguillo Municipality is a municipality in Tabasco in south-eastern Mexico.

Climate

References

Municipalities of Tabasco